Salute to the Flute (reissued as When Lights Are Low) is an album by American jazz flautist Herbie Mann featuring tracks recorded in 1957 for the Epic label.

Reception

AllMusic awarded the album 4 stars and in its review by Scott Yanow, he states: "Mann proves to be an excellent bop soloist".

Track listing
 "When Lights Are Low" (A. K. Salim) - 6:02
 "Little Niles" (Randy Weston) - 6:10
 "Old Honky Tonk Piano Roll Blues" (Herbie Mann) - 4:42
 "Pretty Baby" (Salim) - 4:57
 "Beautiful Love" (Wayne King, Victor Young, Egbert Van Alstyne) - 6:30
 "Hip Scotch" (Joe Puma) - 3:40
 "Song for Ruth" (Mann) - 4:22
 "Noga's Nuggets" (Oscar Pettiford) - 4:04
 "A Ritual" (Mann) - 3:47

Personnel 
Herbie Mann - flute, alto flute
Bernie Glow, Don Stratton, Joe Wilder - trumpet (tracks 1, 5 & 9) 
Urbie Green, Chauncey Welsch - trombone (tracks 1, 5 & 9)
Anthony Ortega - alto saxophone (tracks 1, 2, 4, 5, 7 & 9)
Dick Hafer alto saxophone, tenor saxophone (tracks 1, 2, 4, 5, 7 & 9) 
Dave Kurtzer - tenor saxophone (tracks 2, 4 & 7)
Sol Schlinger - baritone saxophone (tracks 1, 5 & 9)
Joe Puma - guitar, arranger
Hank Jones - piano (tracks 1, 2, 4, 5, 7 & 9)
Oscar Pettiford - bass, arranger 
Gus Johnson (tracks 1, 3, 5, 6, 8 & 9), Philly Joe Jones (tracks 2, 4 & 7) - drums
Gigi Gryce (tracks 2 & 3), A. K. Salim (tracks 1, 4, 5 & 9) - arranger

References 

1957 albums
Herbie Mann albums
Epic Records albums